Żebbuġ Rovers Football Club is a Maltese football club from the village of Żebbuġ, Gozo. The club was founded in 1975. They currently play in the Second Division of Gozo Football League.

They won the BOV GFA 2nd Division Knock Out tournament on April 18, 2022, defeating 2-0 Xagħra United.

Current squad

References 

Football clubs in Malta
Gozitan football clubs
Association football clubs established in 1975
1975 establishments in Malta
Żebbuġ, Gozo